Alho is a surname. Notable people with the surname include:

Arja Alho (born 1954), Finnish politician
Johan Alho (1907–1982), Finnish footballer and a football referee
Nikolai Alho (born 1993), Finnish footballer
Olli Alho (1919–2005), Finnish hurdler
Paulo Alho (born 1980), Portuguese racing driver